Sailing competitions at the 2022 Bolivarian Games in Valledupar, Colombia were held from 27 June to 2 July 2022 at Tominé Reservoir in Guatavita, a sub-venue outside Valledupar.

Seven medal events were scheduled to be contested; three for men, three for women and one mixed event. A total of 73 athletes (36 men and 37 women) will compete in the events. The events were open competitions without age restrictions, except for the Optimist dinghy sailing that is restricted for under-16 sailors.

Peru were the sailing competitions defending champions after having won them in the previous edition in  Santa Marta 2017. Peru and Ecuador won 2 gold medals each, however, Peru reached two more silver medals (3–1) than Ecuador to win the sailing competitions again.

Participating nations
A total of 9 nations (5 ODEBO nations and 4 invited) registered athletes for the rowing competitions. Each nation was able to enter two boats per event and a maximum of 18 sailors (8 men and 10 women). Each nation could register up to two sailors for each men and women singles events and up to two teams conformed by one man and two women each for the mixed event.

Venue
The sailing competitions were held at the Tominé Reservoir at kilometer 10 on the Sesquile - Gutavita road in Guatavita, a municipality of Cundinamarca Department.

Medal summary

Medal table

Medalists

Men's events

Women's events

Mixed event

References

External links
Bolivarianos Valledupar 2022 Sailing

2022 in sailing
2022 Bolivarian Games